John Gebbie Stewart (4 September 1921 – 17 May 1990) was a Scottish professional footballer who played as an outside right for Raith Rovers and Birmingham City.

A former miner born in Lochgelly, Fife, Stewart started his professional career at Raith Rovers, and moved to Birmingham City in January 1948. He had pace and a direct style, and in his first full season at the club, 1948–49, finished as leading goalscorer with 11 league goals for the newly promoted side struggling in the top flight. Injury disrupted his last couple of seasons at Birmingham, and he returned to Raith in 1955 having made 218 appearances in all competitions with 55 goals. He was appointed trainer at Raith and remained in football until 1963.

Honours

As a player 
Birmingham City

Football League Second Division: 1947–48

As an individual 

 Raith Rovers Hall of Fame

References

1921 births
1990 deaths
People from Lochgelly
Scottish footballers
Association football outside forwards
Raith Rovers F.C. players
Birmingham City F.C. players
Scottish Football League players
English Football League players
Footballers from Fife